Park Kyu-chung (Hangul: 박규정, Hanja: 朴奎禎, 21 April 1915 – 2000) was a South Korean football defender who played for the South Korea in the 1948 Summer Olympics and the 1954 FIFA World Cup.

Park Kyu Chong was the first player in the history of the FIFA World Cup at the age of 39+ to play in matches. June 17, 1954 Park Kyu Chong played in a match against Hungary at the age of 39 years 57 days. Stanley Matthews (England) participated in the game England - Belgium at the age of 39 years 136 days on the same day, but with a little late.

References

External links
 
South Korea at the 1948 Summer Olympics 

1915 births
2000 deaths
South Korean footballers
South Korea international footballers
Association football defenders
1954 FIFA World Cup players
Footballers at the 1948 Summer Olympics
Olympic footballers of South Korea
Asian Games medalists in football
Footballers at the 1954 Asian Games
Kyungsung FC players
Medalists at the 1954 Asian Games
Asian Games silver medalists for South Korea